Yevhen Anatoliyovych Borovyk (born 2 March 1985) is a Ukrainian retired professional footballer who played as a goalkeeper.

Career
He joined Kryvbas from Metalist in 2007. Borovyk also played 1 game for the Ukrainian Olympic team.

On 15 August 2017, Borovyk signed with Bulgarian club Cherno More Varna. On 8 September 2017, he made his debut in a 0–2 away defeat by Beroe. On 7 October 2017, Borovyk suffered an ankle fracture during training and was going on to be sidelined until the end of the year. On 6 December, his contract was terminated by mutual consent. On 19 February 2018, Borovyk signed with Kazakhstan Premier League club Akzhayik.

Coaching career 
In May 2020, he became a goalkeeping coach at the headquarters of Chornomorets head coach Serhiy Kovalets.

References

External links
 
 

1985 births
Living people
People from Pryluky
Ukrainian footballers
Association football goalkeepers
Piddubny Olympic College alumni
Ukrainian expatriate footballers
Expatriate footballers in Russia
Expatriate footballers in Bulgaria
Expatriate footballers in Kazakhstan
Ukrainian expatriate sportspeople in Russia
Ukrainian expatriate sportspeople in Bulgaria
Ukrainian expatriate sportspeople in Kazakhstan
FC Yevropa Pryluky players
FC Nyva Vinnytsia players
FC Kryvbas Kryvyi Rih players
FC Metalist Kharkiv players
FC Dnipro players
FC Moscow players
FC Arsenal Kyiv players
FC Metalurh Zaporizhzhia players
FC Chornomorets Odesa players
FC Karpaty Lviv players
PFC Cherno More Varna players
FC Akzhayik players
FC Obolon-Brovar Kyiv players
Ukrainian Premier League players
Ukrainian First League players
First Professional Football League (Bulgaria) players
Kazakhstan Premier League players
Sportspeople from Chernihiv Oblast